Bruce Stern (September 25, 1942 – July 18, 2007) was an American attorney, photographer, and gun collector. He served on the board of directors of the National Rifle Association.

Stern graduated from the Wharton School at the University of Pennsylvania in 1964 and earned his J.D. at NYU, and his master's degree at the University of Bridgeport. A Captain in the U.S. Army, Stern was a Vietnam veteran, serving at Long Binh, and was a member of American Legion Post 141. In addition to his legal career, Stern was the founder and president of the Coalition of Connecticut Sportsmen, and a contributing writer to its magazine, Hook 'N' Bullet. He died on July 18, 2007.

References 

University of Bridgeport alumni
Wharton School of the University of Pennsylvania alumni
New York University School of Law alumni
2007 deaths
1943 births